The Musée de la Chartreuse ("Charterhouse museum") is the municipal museum of Molsheim, a small town in the Bas-Rhin department of France. Founded in 1946 by Henri Gerlinger (1899–1959), it is located since 1985 in the former Carthusian monastery, which had been active from 1598 until its disbandment during the French Revolution, in 1792.

The remaining buildings still cover a vast area. The museum includes the great cloister, several reconstructed monastic cells, and some 18th-century reception rooms, and is in part dedicated to the history of the premises. Other sections of the museum include local history (among which the Jesuit college), religious art, and regional folk art. A special section is administered by the "Bugatti Foundation" (Fondation Bugatti), and displays designs, cars, and personal objects from the estate of Ettore Bugatti, as well as works by Carlo, and Rembrandt Bugatti.

Gallery

References

External links 

Official presentation (2018)
Charterhouse museum, Office de Tourisme de Molsheim et de Mutzig

Musee
Museums in Bas-Rhin
1946 establishments in France
Museums established in 1946
Bugatti
Local museums in France
Former monasteries
Automobile museums in France